South Knox Middle-High School is a combination middle school and high school located approximately 6.5 miles southeast of Vincennes, Indiana in an unincorporated community called Verne.

About
South Knox Middle-High School was formed from the merger of local high schools in Monroe City, Fritchton, Wheatland, and Decker (which had earlier incorporated Decker Chapel High School), the school's district encompasses most of southern Knox County.

In 1985, the high school and middle school were organized as two separate schools.

Athletics
Its athletic nickname is the Spartans, and it participates in the Blue Chip Conference. Its colors are red, white, and blue. The school song is "Hail South Knox High." 

The dedication of the gymnasium was held in November 1967, with IHSAA Commissioner Phil N. Eskew presiding. The Spartans won the first boys' basketball game played there, defeating North Posey. The first South Knox boys' basketball coach was Sam Alford, father of Steve Alford. In 1968, South Knox became a charter member of the Blue Chip Conference and has remained a member ever since. In 2013, the boys cross country team was the first team in any sport to appear in the IHSAA State Championship.

See also
 List of high schools in Indiana

References

External links
South Knox High School

Public high schools in Indiana
High schools in Southwestern Indiana
Blue Chip Conference
Schools in Knox County, Indiana
1967 establishments in Indiana